Valverde de Mérida is a municipality located in the province of Badajoz, Extremadura, Spain. According to the 2005 census (INE), the municipality has a population of 1193 inhabitants.

History 

The Battle of Valverde (1385) was fought on 14 October 1385, near Valverde de Mérida, which saw the Kingdom of Portugal winning the battle against the Crown of Castile.

References

Municipalities in the Province of Badajoz